A company man, in the petroleum industry, refers to a representative of an operating/exploration company.

Company man may also refer to:

 Company Man (film), a 2000 film starring Sigourney Weaver and John Turturro
 A Company Man, a 2012 South Korean film starring So Ji-sub
 "Company Man" (Heroes), a television episode
 "The Company Man" (King of the Hill), a television episode
 The Company Man (novel), a 2011 novel by Robert Jackson Bennett
 The Company Man (video game)
 Company Man: Thirty Years of Controversy and Crisis in the CIA, a 2014 non-fiction book by John A. Rizzo
 "The Company Man", a song by a-ha from Minor Earth Major Sky
 Company Man, an educational YouTuber who makes videos about companies